Li Dongjin (born January 1, 1993 in China) is a professional squash player who represents China. She reached a career-high world ranking of World No. 72 in September 2017.

References

External links 

Chinese squash players
Living people
1993 births
Squash players at the 2010 Asian Games
Squash players at the 2014 Asian Games
Squash players at the 2018 Asian Games
Asian Games competitors for China
21st-century Chinese women